Adrian Hayes (born 5 June 1959) is a British record-breaking polar explorer and adventurer, best known for reaching the three extreme points of the Earth—the Three Poles Challenge—which involved walking all the way to the North Pole, South Pole and summiting Mount Everest, all in the shortest period of time (1 year, 217 days - his first Guinness World record).

Along with Canadians Devon McDiarmid and Derek Crowe, he set a second Guinness World record in 2009 for the longest unsupported snowkiting journey in Arctic history, the  vertical crossing of the Greenland ice cap. In 2011 he completed a crossing of the Arabian Desert by foot and camel in a documentary filmed expedition in the footsteps of 1940s British Explorer Wilfred Thesiger. In 2014 Hayes summited the second highest mountain in the world, K2, following his unsuccessful attempt in 2013.

Biography
The middle of three sons to Con and Linda Hayes, Adrian Hayes grew up in his family-run hotel in the New Forest, Hampshire, and was educated at St Mary's College, Southampton. Following two years British Army service in 21 SAS, he attended the Royal Military Academy Sandhurst and served for eight years as an officer in the Brigade of Gurkhas in Hong Kong, Brunei and Oman, the latter a two-year secondment to the Royal Army of Oman in Salalah. After leaving the Army, he studied for an MBA at the University of Nottingham and worked in various international sales managerial positions before joining Airbus as a Regional Sales Director Middle East and West Asia from 2000 to 2006, based in Toulouse, France followed by Dubai, UAE.

Recent expeditions

Mount Everest 2006
Hayes summited Mount Everest on 25 May 2006 by the South East ridge/South Col route from Nepal on his first attempt, as part of a ten-man international Everest summit expedition, led by Henry Todd.

North Pole 2007
On 25 April 2007 Hayes reached the Geographic North Pole after a 50-day expedition covering  (straight line) across the Arctic Ocean from Ward Hunt Island, Canada as part of a three-man team led by Canadian Polar Explorer Richard Weber.

Greenland 2009
In 2009, along with Canadian teammates Devon McDiarmid and Derek Crowe, Hayes set out to complete an unsupported vertical crossing of the Greenland ice Cap from Narsaq on the Atlantic Ocean to JP Kocks Fjord in Peary Land on the Arctic Ocean and then onto Qaanaaq on the Baffin Sea in North-West Greenland. The trio completed the never before undertaken journey in 67 days, covering  (point to point) and achieving the longest unsupported snow-kiting expedition in the Arctic to date. Guinness World Records also recognized the journey in 2010. The film of the expedition, the Emirates NBD Greenland Quest was produced by Nomad Media and broadcast on National Geographic Adventure Channel.

Empty Quarter 2011

Between October–December 2011 Hayes led an expedition re-enacting the travels of British Explorer Wilfred Thesiger across the Arabian Desert, otherwise known as the Rub Al Khali or "Empty Quarter". Travelling with two Beduin team members, Hayes, an Arabic speaker, journeyed by camel and foot from Salalah, Oman to Abu Dhabi, UAE in 44 days, covering . The expedition, titled "Footsteps of Thesiger", was filmed for a television documentary produced by Two Four Media Media charting the modern day expedition, the travels of Thesiger and the culture, heritage and changing lives of the Bedu of Oman and the UAE, and broadcast on Discovery Channel in 2012.

K2 2013 

Between June and August 2013 Hayes was part of six small teams attempting to summit K2 from the Pakistan side, via the Abruzzi Spur.

K2 2014 

On the 60th anniversary of K2's first ascent, with just 330 summiteers in that period and only one year of summit successes from Pakistan in the previous five since the 2008 K2 disaster, Hayes returned to K2 for his second attempt between June- August 2014. He summited the mountain on 26 July 2014, becoming the eighth Briton to reach the top.

Makalu 2015 

In April 2015 Hayes was on a double expedition to attempt Makalu, the world's 5th highest mountain, followed by Lhotse, the world's 4th highest. The expeditions were aborted due to the Nepal Earthquake of 25 April 2015. Hayes, a Nepalese speaker and former registered Paramedic subsequently embarked on providing medical aide in the hills and mountains of the country, which led to the setting up of MIRA Himalaya (Medicine in Remote Areas, Himalaya), a project supported by Nepalese sponsors to provide an annual medical camp in the country.

Campaigner

Hayes campaigns, speaks and writes on economic, social and environmental sustainability and is a patron of UK population charities Population Matters and CHASE Africa.

Author

Hayes's first book, Footsteps of Thesiger, chronicling the life of Sir Wilfred Thesiger, his modern reenaction expedition in Thesiger's trail and the changing lives of the Bedouin of the Arabian Peninsular was published in 2013. His second book, One Man's Climb: A Journey of Trauma, Tragedy and Triumph on K2, detailing his personal story attempting the world's second highest mountain, was published in the UK in November 2018 by Pen and Sword. and worldwide from April 2019

Presenter

Hayes has featured in or presented three documentaries: The Greenland Quest in 2011 for the National Geographic Channel, Footsteps of Thesiger in 2013 and In Inner Mongolia in 2017 for the Discovery Channel.

References

1959 births
Living people
20th-century British Army personnel
British motivational speakers
English expatriates in the United Arab Emirates
Graduates of the Royal Military Academy Sandhurst
Sustainability advocates